Naryshkino is an urban locality (an urban-type settlement) in Uritsky District of Oryol Oblast, Russia. Population:

Notable people
 Aleksandr Selikhov (1994) — Russian footballer

References

Urban-type settlements in Oryol Oblast